William Isham Traeger (February 26, 1880 – January 20, 1935) was an American law enforcement official who served as sheriff of Los Angeles County from 1921 to 1932, and went on to serve one term as a United States Representative from California.

Early life
Traeger was born in Porterville, California, the oldest of five children of Augustus Traeger, a blacksmith who had migrated from Wisconsin in 1872, and his wife Martha Ellen (Dunn) Traeger, who had migrated from Arkansas in 1874. William attended elementary and high schools in Porterville, also assisting his father in his trade; Martha Traeger died in 1895. Traeger served during the Spanish–American War as a private and corporal in the 6th California Volunteer Infantry from May 11 to December 15, 1898.

College
After the war, he studied law at Stanford University, earning his undergraduate degree in 1901. While there, he starred as a tackle on the football team, kicking a field goal to give Stanford a 5–0 victory over California in the 1900 rivalry game (field goals counted for 5 points until 1904); he was captain of the team that played in the first Rose Bowl Game on January 1, 1902, a game in which he tore his shoulder ligament yet continued to play.

Coaching and early law enforcement career
In 1902 he moved to Los Angeles, where he helped in various athletic departments, leading Pomona College's football team to a 3–2 record in 1902 and coaching at Occidental College the following year. He served as a deputy United States Marshal from April 1903 through 1906 and as a deputy sheriff for Los Angeles County from January 1907 to 1911.

He also worked for a general contracting company. While a deputy marshal, he married Alice Collier, who died in 1908 from tuberculosis.

Law school and USC coaching
Traeger attended law school at the University of Southern California. During his time at USC, he served as the head coach of the USC football team for the 1908 season; USC's teams were still called the Methodists before becoming known as the Trojans in 1912. He compiled a 3–1–1 record while coaching at USC; the schedule was entirely against southern California teams, including games against Pomona and Occidental as well as Los Angeles High School, a team he had coached in 1906, and a San Bernardino County athletic club, the only contest outside L.A. County. He was succeeded in 1909 by famous track coach Dean Cromwell.

Legal career and Sheriff
Traeger was admitted to the bar in California in 1909, and began private practice. In 1911, be began serving as deputy clerk for the Supreme Court of California, a position he would hold until 1921. During World War I he enlisted in the Army and served at an officer's training camp.

In 1921, Traeger was appointed Sheriff of Los Angeles County; he was elected to 4-year terms in 1922, 1926 and 1930, serving until December 1932. During his time in office, he reorganized the county jail, established the county's honor camps for first-time misdemeanor offenders, and started the employment contact office which helped prisoners find employment after their release. In 1929 he became the first president of the Los Angeles County Peace Officers' Association.

Congress
In 1932, Traeger was elected as a Republican to the 73rd United States Congress (March 4, 1933 – January 3, 1935) despite the Democratic landslide which occurred that year. He lost his reelection bid to John M. Costello in 1934.

Death
Traeger died at age 54 of a liver disorder at the Wadsworth Hospital in Los Angeles, two weeks after leaving office; he had become ill in late December. He was survived by his second wife, the former Ruth McAllister, a schoolteacher he had married in 1912, and by one daughter from each marriage.

Traeger was interred at Rosedale Cemetery, Los Angeles.

Head coaching record

College

References

External links
 
 

1880 births
1935 deaths
19th-century players of American football
20th-century American politicians
American football tackles
American military personnel of the Spanish–American War
Burials at Angelus-Rosedale Cemetery
High school football coaches in California
American Ku Klux Klan members
Los Angeles County, California sheriffs
Occidental Tigers football coaches
People from Porterville, California
Pomona-Pitzer Sagehens football coaches
Republican Party members of the United States House of Representatives from California
Stanford Cardinal football players
USC Trojans football coaches
United States Army personnel of World War I
United States Marshals
University of Southern California alumni